Sufian is a city which is the capital of Sufian District, Iran.

Sufian may also refer to:

Places 
 Sufian, Afghanistan
 Sufian, India village in the Ajnala tehsil of Amritsar district in the state of Punjab, India
 Sufian, Fars, Iran
 Sufian, Golestan, a village in Iran
 Sufian, Kurdistan, Iran
 Sufian, Oshnavieh, West Azerbaijan Province, Iran
 Sufian, Urmia, West Azerbaijan Province, Iran
 Sufian District, Iran

People 
 Sufian or Sufyan, Muslim name for males
 Sufian Allaw, current Minister of Petroleum and Mineral Resources of Syria
 Sufian Abdullah, Jordanian professional association football player of Palestinian origin
 Sufjan Stevens, American singer-songwriter and multi-instrumentalist
 Abu Sufyan ibn Harb, leader of the Quraish tribe of Mecca
 Sufyan ibn `Uyaynah, eighth century Islamic religious scholar from Mecca
 Sufyan al-Thawri, eighth century tabi'i Islamic scholar, Hafiz and jurist, founder of the Thawri madhhab

See also 
 
 
 
 
 Sofiane (disambiguation)
 Sufi (disambiguation)
 Sufism (disambiguation)
 Sufyani an evil, apocryphal character of Islamic eschatology